Laurence Vanceunebrock is a French woman police officer and politician of La République En Marche! (LREM) who served as a member of the French National Assembly from 2017 to 2022, representing Allier's 2nd constituency.

Political career
In parliament, Vanceunebrock served as member of the Committee on Social Affairs. From 2021, she was the parliament’s rapporteur on legislation to ban so-called conversion therapies that attempt to change an individual's sexual orientation.

In addition to her committee assignments, Vanceunebrock chaired the French-Danish Parliamentary Friendship Group.

Vanceunebrock lost her seat in the first round of the 2022 French legislative election.

Political positions
In 2018, Vanceunebrock joined other co-signatories around Sébastien Nadot in officially filing a request for a commission of inquiry into the legality of French weapons sales to the Saudi-led coalition fighting in Yemen, days before an official visit of Saudi Crown Prince Mohammed bin Salman to Paris.

In 2020, Vanceunebrock went against her parliamentary group's majority and abstained from an important vote on a much discussed security bill drafted by her colleagues Alice Thourot and Jean-Michel Fauvergue that helps, among other measures, curtail the filming of police forces.

Personal life
Vanceunebrock has two daughters.

References

Living people
Deputies of the 15th National Assembly of the French Fifth Republic
La République En Marche! politicians
21st-century French women politicians
Women members of the National Assembly (France)
LGBT legislators in France
1970 births